The Piraquê Açu River is a river of Espírito Santo state in eastern Brazil.

Part of the river basin is contained in the  Augusto Ruschi Biological Reserve, a fully protected area.

See also
List of rivers of Espírito Santo

References

Brazilian Ministry of Transport

Rivers of Espírito Santo